Henry King Stanford (April 22, 1916 – January 1, 2009) was the interim president of the University of Georgia (UGA) from 1986 through 1987 and the third president of the University of Miami from 1962 to 1981.

Stanford's prior academic administration appointments included director of the School of Public Administration at the University of Denver, president of Georgia Southwestern College (now known as Georgia Southwestern State University), president of Georgia State College for Women (now known as Georgia College & State University), and president of Birmingham–Southern College. Before obtaining academic administration appointments, he was a university professor at Emory University and Georgia Institute of Technology (Georgia Tech). His education included Emory University , the University of Denver , and New York University .

Stanford received 13 honorary degrees and received numerous awards including the Eleanor Roosevelt-Israel Humanitarian Award, the “Star of Africa” medal, and the Officer’s Cross of the Order of Merit of the Federal Republic of Germany. He was vice president of the International Association of University Presidents, was on the board of trustees of the Knight Foundation, and served on several corporate boards. Stanford received the regional Brotherhood Award of the National Conference of Christians and Jews, and also received awards from the Anti-Defamation League. The Georgia Board of Regents named him president emeritus of the University of Georgia.

Stanford's previous academic positions include:
 director of the School of Public Administration at the University of Denver
 president of Georgia Southwestern College in Americus (1948 – 1950)
 president of Georgia State College for Women in Milledgeville (1953 – 1956)
 president of Birmingham Southern College (1957 – 1962)
 president of the University of Miami (1962 – 1981)
 interim president of the University of Georgia

Retirement and death
Stanford climbed Mount Everest in 1988 at the age of 72. He died at the age of 92 at his home in Americus, Georgia, on New Year's Day, 2009.

References 

 From Ahmedunggar to Lavonia Presidents at the University of Georgia 1785-1997, University of Georgia Libraries, Hargrett Rare Book and Manuscript Library 
 Georgia College and State University Bio
 Ruth Stanford Obituary

1916 births
2009 deaths
People from Atlanta
People from Americus, Georgia
Emory University alumni
University of Denver alumni
New York University alumni
Georgia Southwestern State University faculty
Georgia College & State University
Birmingham–Southern College faculty
Presidents of the University of Miami
Presidents of the University of Georgia
20th-century American academics